Annie Madsen (born 2 November 1945) is a Danish fencer. She competed in the women's individual foil events at the 1972, 1976 and 1980 Summer Olympics.

References

External links
 

1945 births
Living people
Danish female foil fencers
Olympic fencers of Denmark
Fencers at the 1972 Summer Olympics
Fencers at the 1976 Summer Olympics
Fencers at the 1980 Summer Olympics
Sportspeople from Frederiksberg